Nana Akua Addo is a German-born Ghanaian model, actress and film producer. She was the second runner-up in Miss Malaika 2003 and winner of Miss Ghana-Germany in 2005. She has received awards including Glitz Style Awards and City People Entertainment Awards.

Education 
As of 2017, she was studying acting at the New York Film Academy in the United States.

Career 
Addo has starred in films including Destiny's Child, Blood, Wanna Be, Rain, Speechless, Never Again and Tears. She also produced two films, Wannabe and Nukuli (The Masked).

Awards 
Some of the awards she has received include:

Most Stylish/Dressed Female Celebrity (Africa) - Abryanz Style and Fashion Awards (Asfa) 2017
Best Dressed celebrity - 2016 Glitz Style Awards
Best Dressed Celebrity - 2017 Glitz Style Awards.
Best Dressed Actress - 2015 Ghana Movie Awards red carpet
Best New Actress - 2014 City People Entertainment Awards.
Honorary Award for personalities and people from Awukugua - Bring Entertainment in collaboration with Chiefs of Awukugua

Personal life 
She is a mother of two children.

References

Living people
Ghanaian female models
New York Film Academy alumni
Ghanaian film actresses
Ghanaian film producers
Ghanaian women film producers
Year of birth missing (living people)